James Patterson (June 29, 1932 – August 19, 1972) was an American actor who won a Tony Award for his role in the 1968 Harold Pinter play The Birthday Party.

His best-known film role was in Lilith (1964), and he had numerous guest appearances on television through the early 1970s. He was also well known for his appearance as Jeffrey Butler in the cult classic horror film Silent Night, Bloody Night.

Background
Born in Derry, Pennsylvania, Patterson was both a stage and screen actor. For his stage work, he won both Tony and Obie awards. His career started on a Pittsburgh radio show with "Starlets on Parade" as a boy soprano. For a time, he was a painter and later studied acting at the Carnegie Institute of Technology with Hebert Berghof. He met his future wife, actress,  Rochelle Oliver on the set of the off-Broadway production of The Brothers Karamazov. He was also a cast member. In 1960, they were living together in their small apartment on the upper East Side.

Career
In 1968, Patterson played the part of Dave Barca in Hawaii Five-O, episode "The Ways of Love".

In 1972, Patterson was in the horror slasher film Silent Night, Bloody Night that starred Patrick O’Neal, playing Jeffrey Butler, a man trying to sell a house with a terrible history that belonged to his grandfather Wilford Butler.

Death
Patterson died of cancer at age 40 in 1972 in New York City. He was survived by his wife Rochelle and son John.

Filmography

References

External links
 
 
 

1932 births
1972 deaths
Male actors from Pennsylvania
American male film actors
American male stage actors
Tony Award winners
Deaths from cancer in New York (state)
People from Westmoreland County, Pennsylvania
20th-century American male actors